Pyrobotrys is a genus of green algae in the family Spondylomoraceae.

References

External links

Chlamydomonadales genera
Chlamydomonadales